Hans Jürgen Press (1926 – 2002) was a German illustrator and writer of children's books. Many of his books contain stories and puzzles in which the reader searches the illustrations for clues to the mystery.

Biography 
Press was born in Klein Konopken, East Prussia. He served for about four months during World War II, when he was captured in France and transported to Marseille, where he was shipped to Oran. After 3 or 4 days he was transported to the United States. Press was trained as an unarmed sail plane  glider pilot. While a prisoner of war at Ft. D.A. Russell in Texas, he painted detailed murals of far West Texas mountain scenes at Building 98 in Marfa, Texas. The murals are on the National Register of Historic Places. He departed Marfa, Texas, in 1945 while there he created two west Texas watercolors of local residents one performing a Spanish dance and another playing the Spanish guitar.

He returned from captivity to Hamburg in 1948 and attended the Hochschule für Bildende Künste. In 1953 he began to illustrate for "sternchen", the children's supplement of German magazine stern. He invented , a little man with moustache and bowler hat who never talked but whose comic strips were commented in verse. The Adventures of the Black Hand Gang was a combination of story and illustration which appeared in weekly chapters, the solution to this week's riddle was given the next week.

Press was one of the inventors of the "Wimmelbild", a genre of illustration deliberately overcrowded with detail, to please children on their search for a certain item. He also wrote and illustrated books about science and numerous puzzle and play books for children.

His son, Julian Press, is also an author and illustrator.

Bibliography 
 The Adventures of the Black Hand Gang
 The Black Hand Gang and the Treasure in Breezy Lake
The Black Hand Gang and the Mysterious House
Der Natur auf der Spur

References

External links 
Author information at Randomhouse.de
 Lambiek Comiclopedia article.
Adventures of the Black Hand Gang Facebook Fan-page
 A freeware "The Adventures Of The Black Hand Gang" interactive e-book game including every story is available at: The Adventures Of The Black Hand Gang, This game allows you to read the entire adventures of the gang while participating via your mouse to help solve the puzzles on each page.

1926 births
2002 deaths
People from Giżycko County
People from East Prussia
German caricaturists
German children's writers
German illustrators
German prisoners of war in World War II held by the United States
German muralists
German male novelists
20th-century German painters
20th-century German male artists
German male painters
20th-century German novelists
20th-century German male writers
University of Fine Arts of Hamburg alumni